Monongahela virus (MGLV) is a single-stranded, negative-sense Orthohantavirus virus of zoonotic origin that causes hantavirus pulmonary syndrome.

Discovery of virus 
Monongahela virus was first detected in Peromyscus maniculatus nubiterrae (Cloudland deer mice) captured in the Monongahela National Forest in West Virginia in 1985.

Transmission 
This member virus of Sin Nombre orthohantavirus has not been shown to transfer from person to person. Transmission by aerosolized rodent excreta still remains the only known way the virus is transmitted to humans. In general, droplet and/or fomite transfer has not been shown in the hantaviruses in either the hemorrhagic or pulmonary forms.

In two cases in Pennsylvania, the patients were living in rural areas and had recent exposure to rodent excreta prior to the onset of symptoms. Both patients developed rapid onset of respiratory distress and pulmonary edema, believed to be the result of cytokine storm, and both expired within 5 days of onset of symptoms.

See also 
 1993 Four Corners hantavirus outbreak
 New York orthohantavirus

References

External links 
 Sloan Science and Film / Short Films / Muerto Canyon by Jen Peel 29 minutes
 "Hantaviruses, with emphasis on Four Corners Hantavirus" by Brian Hjelle, M.D., Department of Pathology, School of Medicine, University of New Mexico
 CDC's Hantavirus Technical Information Index page
 Viralzone: Hantavirus
 Virus Pathogen Database and Analysis Resource (ViPR): Bunyaviridae
 Occurrences and deaths in North and South America

Viral diseases
Hantaviridae
Rodent-carried diseases
Biological weapons
Infraspecific virus taxa